Rangaraj Pandey Ragunathacharya is an Indian journalist and actor.

He started his career at Dinamalar and Visual Media Career at Thanthi TV. Later he started his Youtube channel Chankyaa Network.

Early life and education

He was born in a Brahmin family  of Bihari origin in Srivilliputhur. His parents, who were from Buxar district, Bihar, migrated to Tamil Nadu before his birth. He did his schooling at a Tamil medium government school in Srivilliputhur. He  pursued a Master of Arts degree in Tamil literature, from Madurai Kamaraj University. Pandey currently settled in Chennai along with his family.

Career
Pandey hosted Kelvikku Enna Badhil and Ayutha Ezhuthu on Thanthi TV

He resigned his post and quit Thanthi TV on 9 December 2018.

He currently hosts a personal blog channel on YouTube called Chanakyaa.

Acting career
In 2019, he was chosen to make his acting debut alongside Ajith Kumar in Nerkonda Paarvai produced by Boney Kapoor.

Filmography 

 Nerkonda Paarvai (2019) - Advocate Sathyamoorthy.
 Ka Pae Ranasingam (2020) - Tamizhkumaran, Ramanathapuram district Collector.

Awards and accolades

References 

Living people
21st-century Indian journalists
Indian television executives
Indian television news anchors
Indian television talk show hosts
Indian male journalists
Indian male television journalists
Indian political journalists
1975 births